The Hôtel d'Esmivy de Moissac (a.k.a. Hôtel de Villars) is a listed hôtel particulier in Aix-en-Provence, Bouches-du-Rhône, France.

Location
It is located on the corner of the Cours Mirabeau and the Avenue Victor Hugo, in the centre of Aix-en-Provence. Its exact address is 4, Cours Mirabeau.

History
Construction began in 1710. In 1757, its facade was designed by French architect Georges Vallon (1688-1767), who designed many other buildings in Aix, including the Hôtel du Poët at the top of the Cours Mirabeau.

The hotel is three-story high. Its facade has two Doric columns supporting the balcony overlooking the Cours Mirabeau on the first floor. Inside, there is a grand staircase with a wrought-iron railing. On the ceilings, there is ornamental plasterwork representing angels.

Its original owner was Lois d'Esmivy de Moissac, an Advisor to the "Cours des Comptes". In 1750, de Moissac's grandson sold it to Honoré Armand de Villars (1702-1770).

Heritage significance
It has been listed as a "monument historique" since January 5, 1993.

References

Hôtels particuliers in Aix-en-Provence
Monuments historiques of Aix-en-Provence
Houses completed in 1757